The buccinator crest (Latin crista buccinatoria) is a bony crest of the human mandible, that passes from the base of the coronoid process to the area of the third molar. The alveolar border of the buccinator muscle attaches upon it.

References

Bones of the head and neck